Murade Isaac Murargy (born 10 May 1946) is a Mozambican statesman who served as the Executive Secretary of the Community of Portuguese Language Countries, from 2012 to 2017.

Career
Murargy was previously the Mozambican ambassador to France, Brazil, and UNESCO. 

Murargy also served as the Secretary-General of the Presidency of Joaquim Chissano, between 1995 and 2005.

Executive Secretary of the CPLP
Murade Murargy took over as executive secretary of the Community of Portuguese Language Countries in July 2012, succeeding Guinean Domingos Simões Pereira. At the 10th CPLP Summit which took place in Dili (East Timor), in 2014, he was re-elected for another term, being succeeded in 2016 by São Toméan Maria do Carmo Silveira.

References

Executive Secretaries of the Community of Portuguese Language Countries
Living people
1946 births
Mozambican politicians
Mozambican diplomats
University of Lisbon alumni